

1965
Hrachya Kochar (for "Nahapet" novel),
Aram Khachaturian,
Sergei Aslamazyan, Avet Gabrielian, Rafayel Davidian, Henry Talalyan (Komitas quartet),
Martiros Sarian
Gohar Gasparyan

1967
Paruyr Sevak ("Anlreli Zangakatun" poem),
Arno Babajanian ("Six pictures for piano" composition),
Harutyun Kalents (for the portraits of A. Gitovich, A. Alikhanian etc.)
Yervand Kochar (Sasuntsi David monument)
Olga Gulazian
Edgar Hovhannisyan, Vilen Galstyan ("Haverjakan kurk" ballet),
Frunze Dovlatyan, Albert Yavuryan ("Barev, yes em" film)
Stepan Kevorkov, Erazm Melik-Karamyan, Ivan Dildaryan, Artashes Jalalyan (films about Kamo)

1971
Gegham Sarian
Vakhtang Ananyan
Grigor Yeghiazaryan
Hovhannes Chekijian
Vardan Ajemian
Ara Sargsyan
Gurgen Borian, Khoren Abrahamyan, Frunze Dovlatian, Arkady Hayrapetian, Sergey Gevorkyan, Karen Masian, Rafayel Babayan ("Saroyan yeghbayrner" film)
Alexander Tamanian, Sergey Merkurov, Gevork Tamanian, Samvel Safaryan, Varazdat Arevshatyan, Mark Grigoryan, Eduard Sarapyan, Levon Vardanov, Natalia Paremuzova (Lenin Square of Yerevan)
Razmik Alaverdian, Ruben Badalyan, Suren Burkhajian, Gurgen Mnatsakanyan (building of Yerevan Sundukian theater)

1988 

 Silva Kaputikyan

Soviet awards
State Prize Winners
List